The 1979 Montana Grizzlies football team was an American football team that represented the University of Montana in the Big Sky Conference during the 1979 NCAA Division I-AA football season. In their fourth year under head coach Gene Carlson, the team compiled a 3–7 record.

Montana won three games and Carlson was let go at the end of the season; his annual salary was $24,000.

Schedule

References

Montana
Montana Grizzlies football seasons
Montana Grizzlies football